Kehinde Kamson (born 14 August 1961 in Lagos, Nigeria) is a Nigerian entrepreneur, business leader, and philanthropist. She works in the fast food and business sectors in Nigeria. She is best known as the Founder and CEO of Sweet Sensation Confectionery Limited – one of the strongest brands in the fast food industry in Nigeria which she started from a backyard shed and a tiny converted security house with just two used air conditioners and a few other refurbished scrap equipment, after giving up a lucrative accounting career. She is one of those credited with changing the competitive outlook of the Quick Service Restaurant industry in Nigeria thereby leading to the astronomical growth seen in the industry in the 90s and first decade of the 2000s.

Early life and education
Kamson's parents were educators. Her father, Adeleke Beniah Adelaja, was one of the principals of the Church Missionary Society Grammar School (CMS Grammar School) - the oldest secondary grammar school in Nigeria. Kehinde's mother, Omoba Adebayo Evangelin Adelaja was the proprietress of Eva Adelaja Secondary School – a secondary school in Lagos, Nigeria. Kamson was born a twin on 14 August 1961. The twins were the last of six children.

Her nursery school was at the International Women's Society Nursery School in Lagos while her primary school was University of Lagos Staff School.

Kehinde was tom boyish as a kid and it all started with eight boys. One of Eva Adelaja's siblings who always came around to celebrate Christmas and Easter with Kehinde's family had eight sons. Whenever Kehinde's father was serving outside Lagos, her parents would send her and her twin brother to the uncle's house and she would find herself having nine boys as playmates. There was no sport the nine boys and one girl didn't do, from pole vaulting to high jumping to playing football. Those translated into the roles she played in her secondary school - St Anne's School, Ibadan, Nigeria - where she was into high jumping and table tennis.

She was nominated to represent her school and eventually West Africa in the bid to qualify for the All African Games. She has a gold medal for playing table tennis for West Africa but she didn't make it to the All African games.

She did her A-Levels at Queens College in Lagos and earned a bachelor's degree in Accounting from the University of Lagos, Nigeria. She is also a graduate of the Lagos Business School.

Business career 
Kamson started Sweet Sensation - a Quick Service Restaurant business - in 1994 from a tiny guard house in Ilupeju, Lagos after she had spent about 10 years doing the business on a small scale from her young family's garage. The business has since grown to become one of the most successful chain of Quick Service Restaurant businesses in Nigeria with over 25 outlets across the country, over 2,000 employees and over 60 array of meals that are served daily.

Her entrepreneurial journey started when she watched her succeed at one business after another. Her mother sold everything imaginable and travelled around the world to search for the best bargains on products she took to Nigeria to sell. That close proximity to her mother while she ran her businesses, planted the seed of entrepreneurship in Kamson.

After her graduation at the University of Lagos, she got a job as an accountant while raising her young family. She had married and started having children early. She realized she couldn't cope with managing her family while holding on to a 9 to 5 job so she quit and pondered over what to do. That was the period she decided to start her food business which eventually became Sweet Sensation.

Kamson's approach to the Quick Service Restaurant business has been to combine local and international menus while constantly creating new recipes. A typical Sweet Sensation restaurant will have menus consisting of Sukiyaki, Genève Peppersoup(GPS, Grillo Fish, Farmers pottage, Indiana Rice, Soul food, Yamboree, Swag Chicken, Chickito and regulars like Meat Pie, Chicken Pie, Puff Chicken, Scotch Egg, Fried rice, Jollof rice, Coconut and Leafy Rice and different types of soup.

References

External links 
 Official website
 Beniah Adelaja
 financial freedom inspiration
 Alert naija

1961 births
Living people
Businesspeople from Lagos
20th-century Nigerian businesswomen
20th-century Nigerian businesspeople
University of Lagos alumni
Nigerian twins
21st-century Nigerian businesswomen
21st-century Nigerian businesspeople
Nigerian food company founders
Nigerian women company founders
Nigerian restaurateurs
St Anne's School, Ibadan alumni